Nafanua may refer to:
 Western Samoan patrol vessel Nafanua, a Pacific Forum patrol vessel, operated by Western Samoa
 Samoan patrol vessel Nafanua II, a Guardian class replacement for the original Nafanua, commissioned in late 2019
 Nafanua is a nickname for the Samoa women's national cricket team
 Nafanua Volcano is a name applied to an active underwater cone in the Vailulu'u volcano.
 Nafanua was a historically important Samoan, also known as the "Warrior Princess"